M. Louise Thomas ( Palmer; 1822 – February 14, 1907) was an American social leader in women's organizations in the late 19th and early 20th centuries. She was also a philanthropist of national repute. Thomas served as president of the Woman's Centenary Association of the Universalist Church (WCA), the fourth president of Sorosis, and the treasurer of the National Council of Women.

Biography
Maria Louise Palmer was born in Pottsville, Pennsylvania, 1822, during the temporary residence there of her parents, both of whom were natives of Pennsylvania. Her father, Judge Strong W. Palmer, of Pottsville, was of old Puritan stock, being on his mother's side a lineal descendant of Gov. William Bradford and Rev. John Robinson, the pastor of the Mayflower; and on that of his father, of Myles Standish.

In 1843, she married Rev. Abel Charles Thomas (1807-1880), a Universalist minister. She became the constant co-worker with him in all the varied duties incident to a minister's wife. She was deeply interested in the religious training of youth. She was also involved in the different aid societies connected with the church. Her married life was begun in Brooklyn, New York. From there, they moved to Cincinnati, Ohio; then Philadelphia, Pennsylvania, where for 15 years, she labored in every branch of church work, while also superintending the education of her two sons.

During this period, she and the children accompanied Rev. Thomas in an extended tour through Great Britain and on the Continent, spending 18 months in travel. During this tour, many friendships were made including with the best literary minds of the day. Her vivid pictures of foreign life and her graphic descriptions of the varied events of those months were published and widely circulated.

Shortly after their return home, Philadelphia became the busy centre for the North during the civil war. Thomas gained prominence for her charity during the war, helping to organize the Woman's Sanitary Association, the object of which was to nurse and help care for sick and injured soldiers. She saw the need of a direct, personal, womanly influence to communicate the soldiers and their distant homes, and at once organized a system of correspondence with anxious friends, and of personal visitations of the sick and wounded, during which she wrote thousands of letters, giving nearly her whole time to the work.

At the close of the war, Thomas's health suffered greatly from the long strain of overwork, and her husband having been for several years also very feeble, it was thought best for them to seek rest in the country. Accordingly in the Spring of 1864, they removed to Hightstown, New Jersey, a thriving farming neighborhood, with a Universalist Church. Up to this time, Mrs. Thomas had never spent a single week on a farm, nor in the country, except as a traveler journeying from place to place. She made friends with the farmers, asked them questions on all sorts of farming subjects, examined their flocks and herds, scrutinized their corn bins and cattle stalls, watched the green-houses, the propagating beds and the nursling fruit trees, and studied soils and fertilizers. At the same time, she attended sedulously to all the requirements of her social position and kept up with the standard literature of the day.

Their next home was in Bridgeport, Connecticut, where they spent two years.

In 1867, they purchased a small farm, the  estate of Thomas Lloyd Wharton in Tacony, Philadelphia. Here, from the very first, Mrs. Thomas had the entire and sole direction and management of all the farming operations, illustrating by a quiet, yet persistent energy, that a woman could be a successful agriculturist, and at the same time an educated and refined lady. While closely familiar with all the details of field, garden, woodland and dairy work, she never allowed these intimacies to dwarf her purely intellectual labors. Her crops of wheat, rye, oats, corn and hay were equal to any in the neighborhood. She also managed a small but select herd of Alderney cattle, all of the purest blood and all raised on the place from imported stock. She was also a skillful apiarian. Her poultry-house and poultry yard were filled with pure blooded light Brahma fowls.

She was an intimate friend of Abraham Lincoln, Edwin Stanton, P. T. Barnum, and Susan B. Anthony. Thomas conceived of the idea for a library for the growing community of Tacony (which endures today as the Tacony branch of the Free Library of Philadelphia), and served as secretary of the National Council of Women while Susan B. Anthony was vice-president. Thomas brought up and educated a large number of boys and girls, mostly orphans of various nationalities. Some of them were her helpers upon the farm.

In religion, Thomas was a Universalist. For six years, she was the Secretary of the Pennsylvania Universalist Convention. From the very first, she was an active member of the WCA. She was elected Vice President for Pennsylvania at its organization in Buffalo, New York, in September, 1869, and retained that office eleven years, when she gave it up to become the organization's second President. In 1871, she was one of a committee of three, appointed to submit a constitution for its re-organization, and in 1873, she became one of its incorporators for National Work in the District of Columbia. She also had the exclusive charge of the publication of tracts and books for the WCA, the only organized Tract Society of the Universalist Church.

In 1880, a month after she was widowed, Thomas was elected to the office of president of the WCA. She at once took up the duties devolving upon that office. In Sorosis, in the Woman's Congress, in the New Century Club, in all her public connections, she was highly efficient. Her home in New York City contained rare old books and manuscripts. Her library numbered between 3,000 and 4,000 well-selected volumes. Her collection of antique coins, engravings, old manuscripts and autographs was large and rare.

In 1899, during the Russian famine, the U.S. Government appointed her, with Dr. De Witt Talmage, to go to Russia and investigate the conditions. She spent several months abroad and personally supervised the distribution of the shipload of food stuffs and clothes sent to the sufferers.

Death
Maria Louise Palmer Thomas died of heart failure and old age in New York City, February 14, 1907. She was buried at Philadelphia's Laurel Hill Cemetery.

References

1822 births
1907 deaths
American feminists
People from Hightstown, New Jersey
People from Pottsville, Pennsylvania
Clubwomen
Social leaders
Philanthropists from New Jersey
American women philanthropists
American business executives